Southeast Park Avenue is a light rail station on the MAX Orange Line located at Southeast McLoughlin Boulevard and Park Avenue in Oak Grove, an unincorporated area neighboring Milwaukie in Clackamas County, Oregon, in the United States. It is the terminus and southernmost stop on the Orange Line and has a 401-space park and ride facility.

Older plans for the station included a parking garage south of Southeast Park Avenue that were later scrapped.

Originally, it was planned that this station would be one of two MAX stations, the other being Southeast Bybee Boulevard (also on the Orange Line), that would have fare turnstiles installed as part of a TriMet pilot project during the testing of the Hop Fastpass electronic fare system in 2017, but those plans have not proceeded.

On August 5, 2022, a MAX train collided into a stopblock and damaged parts of the platform.

Bus service
Along with the MAX Orange Line, the station is served by the following bus lines:
33 - McLoughlin/King Rd.
99 - Macadam/McLoughlin

See also
 Rebirth (sculpture), proposed public art for the station
 To Grandmother's House, 2015

References

External links
SE Park Avenue station information from TriMet
MAX Light Rail Stations – more general TriMet page

2015 establishments in Oregon
MAX Light Rail stations
MAX Orange Line
Oak Grove, Oregon
Railway stations in Clackamas County, Oregon
Railway stations in the United States opened in 2015